The Admiralty spiny skink (Tribolonotus brongersmai), also known commonly as Brongersma's helmet skink, is a species of lizard in the family Scincidae. The species is endemic to the Admiralty Islands.

Etymology
The specific name, brongersmai, is in honor of Dutch herpetologist Leo Brongersma.

Habitat
The natural habitat of T. brongersmai is unknown. The holotype was collected on a copra plantation, beneath a pile of rotting coconut husks.

Reproduction
T. brongersmai is oviparous.

References

Further reading
Cogger HG (1972). "A new scincid lizard of the genus Tribolonotus from Manus Island, New Guinea". Zoologische Mededelingen 47: 202–210 + Plate I. (Tribolonotus brongersmai, new species).

Tribolonotus
Reptiles of Papua New Guinea
Reptiles described in 1972
Taxa named by Harold Cogger
Skinks of New Guinea